The Central Military Commission of the Workers' Party of Korea (CMC) is an organ of the Central Committee of the Workers' Party of Korea (WPK) which is responsible for coordinating the Party organizations within the Korean People's Army (KPA). One of the CMC's primary functions is to authorize defense and munitions spending and product orders, and to determine how natural resources and products from military-controlled production units are earmarked and distributed domestically and for sale abroad. According to the WPK Charter, the CMC directs WPK activities in the KPA and is chaired by the WPK General Secretary. The CMC relies on a number of organizations to carry out its mandate, including the General Political Bureau of the Korean People's Army, the WPK Military Department, and the WPK Machine-Building Department. The CMC also uses the WPK Military Affairs Department to transmit guidance and indoctrination of North Korea's reserve military training units.

History
The Central Military Commission of the Workers' Party of Korea was established at the 5th plenary meeting of the 4th Central Committee of the Workers' Party of Korea held on 10–14 December 1962. During its establishment, it was a committee subordinate to the WPK Central Committee under the full name Military Committee of the Central Committee of the Workers' Party of Korea.

The committee was organized to its present form at the 6th plenary meeting of the 6th WPK Central Committee held on 29–31 August 1982.  An amendment to the WPK charter in 1982 is believed to have made the CMC equal to the Central Committee, enabling it (among other things) to elect the WPK leader. The last public listing of the CMC was at the 21st Plenary Session of the 6th Central Committee in December 1993. By the 3rd Conference, seven of its nineteen 1993 members remained; the other twelve had either died, retired or were purged. The CMC was revitalized at the 3rd Conference, with Kim Jong-un and Ri Yong-ho elected as deputy chairmen. Except for his Central Committee membership, this was Kim Jong-un's only title at this time; in many ways, the CMC enabled him to develop a patronage network. New members included Vice Marshal Kim Yong-chun (Minister of People's Armed Forces), General Kim Myong-ruk (Chief of the Operation Bureau of the General Staff), General Ri Pyong-chol (Commander of the Korean People's Air Force), Admiral Jong Myong-do (Commander of the Korean People's Navy), Lieutenant General Kim Yong-chol, Colonel General Choe Kyong-song (heads of the KPA's special forces) General Choe Pu-il and Colonel General Choe Sang-ryo (members of the General Staff). Civilians, such as Jang Song-thaek (head of the Administrative Department), also had seats on the commission. At the 4th Conference, Choe Ryong-hae was appointed CMC deputy chairman; Vice Marshal Hyon Chol-hae, General Ri Myong-su and Kim Rak-gyom were elected to the commission.

Current membership

, the Central Military Commission consists of the chairman, vice chairman, and 11 members.

See also 

 Central Committee of the Workers' Party of Korea
 Central Military Commission of the Communist Party of China
 Central Military Commission of the Communist Party of Vietnam

References

Citations

Sources 
 Journal entries

 

 Books

 
 
 
 
 
 
 

Military of North Korea
Central Military Commission of the Workers' Party of Korea
Politics of North Korea
National security councils